Chilmari is an upazila of Kurigram District in the Division of Rangpur, Bangladesh.

History
Chilmari was river port during the Pakistani and British Rule. During the war of Independence of Bangladesh in 1971, the Chilmari Riverborne Amphibious Landing Assault was conducted by then BDF Sector 11, Mankarchar Sub-Sector, led by Squadron Leader M. Hamidullah Khan with participation of the 3rd East Bengal Regiment.

Geography
It has 20129 households and total area 224.97 km2. Situated in the northern part of Bangladesh, it is located by the Indo-Bangladesh frontier. Chilmari Upazila is intersected by the mighty Brahmaputra River.

The upazila is bounded by Ulipur Upazila on the north, Char Rajibpur Upazila and Sundarganj Upazila of Gaibandha District on the south, Raomari Upazila and Char Rajibpur Upazila on the east, Sundarganj and Ulipur upazilas on the west.

Demographics
As of the 1991 Bangladesh census, Chilmari has a population of 100516. Males constitute 49.98% of the population, and females 50.02%. This Upazila's eighteen up population is 47851. Chilmari has an average literacy rate of 23.7% (7+ years), and the national average of 32.4% literate.

Administration
Chilmari Upazila is divided into six union parishads: Ashtamir Char, Chilmari, Nayar Hat, Ramna, Raniganj, and Thanahat. The union parishads are subdivided into 50 mauzas and 166 villages.

Ninth Parliament election from Kurigram-4

In the ninth parliament election (জাতীয় সংসদ নির্বাচন)  held on 29 December 2008 a total of eight candidates, including two independent ones, are contesting but the contest will be mainly limited to three candidates: former JP MP Md. Golam Habib Dulal from JP-Ershad, Md. Jakir Hossain from AL and Md. Nur Alam Mukul from Jamaat-e Islami candidate of BNP-led four-party alliance. The Jamaat-e Islami candidate is using 'Scale' as the symbol.

The majority voters are in the eastern  side of the Brahmaputra river. There are 1,56,822 voters in Raumari and Rajipur upazilas,  while 71,730 voters in Chilmari upazila. Of the Chilmari voters, there are about 20,000 voters in Astomir Char and Nayarhat unions under Chilmari that is situated on the eastern side of the Brahmaputra river.

Finally Md. Jakir Hossain from AL elected MP for the 9th Parliament election, 2008 ( Kurigram-4).

Notable residents
 Mohammad Sadakat Hossain, Member of Parliament, lived in Chilmari.

See also
Upazilas of Bangladesh
Districts of Bangladesh
Divisions of Bangladesh

References

Upazilas of Kurigram District